"One More Try" is a hit single, released in 1988 by Canadian band Brighton Rock. The song appears on their 1988 album Take a Deep Breath. "One More Try" is Brighton Rock's most successful single, with heavy airplay on Canadian radio it peaked at number 15 in Canada. The song was also ranked #16 on "Top 25 Cancon singles of '88".

Track listing
"One More Try"
"Shootin' for Love"

Music video
The band shot a music video for their song "One More Try". The video features the band performing in a studio. The video features Canadian supermodel Monika Schnarre who is seen in the video taking pictures of the band while they perform. At the end of the video she can be seen playing guitar.

Personnel
Gerry McGhee – vocals
Greg Fraser – guitars
Steve Skreebs – bass guitar
Johnny Rogers – keyboards
Mark Cavarzan – drums

References

External links
Brighton Rock
"One More Try" music video

1988 singles
Brighton Rock (band) songs
Song recordings produced by Jack Richardson (record producer)
Hard rock ballads
1988 songs
Warner Music Group singles